A ladle is a type of cooking implement used for soup, stew, or other foods.

Although designs vary, a typical ladle has a long handle terminating in a deep bowl, frequently with the bowl oriented at an angle to the handle to facilitate lifting liquid out of a pot or other vessel and conveying it to a bowl. Some ladles involve a point on the side of the basin to allow for finer stream when pouring the liquid; however, this can create difficulty for left handed users, as it is easier to pour towards oneself. Thus, many of these ladles feature such pinches on both sides.

In modern times ladles are usually made of the same stainless steel alloys as other kitchen utensils; however, they can be made of aluminium, silver, plastics, melamine resin, wood, bamboo or other materials.

In ancient times ladles were often made from plants such as calabash (bottle gourd) or even sea-shells.

Ladles are also a part of  religious  rituals in many cultures. In a Japanese temple, wooden ladle  known as Hishaku is used in performing Chozu, a ritual required before entering the temple, signifying self purification.

References

External links
 

Spoons
Serving utensils